Janan Lu (also Romanized as Jānān Lū and Jānānlū) is a village in Minjavan-e Sharqi Rural District of Minjavan District, Khoda Afarin County, East Azerbaijan province, Iran. At the 2006 National Census, its population was 604 in 153 households, when it was in the former Khoda Afarin District of Kaleybar County. The following census in 2011 counted 1,786 people in 496 households, by which time Khoda Afarin District had been riased tothe level of a county and divided into three districts. The latest census in 2016 showed a population of 1,742 people in 555 households; it was the largest village in its rural district.

History
The online edition of the Dehkhoda Dictionary, quoting Iranian Army files, refers to Jananlu as a Malaria-infested location with a population of 284. At the time, Jananlu was the largest village of Minjavan District. Moreover,  a clan of Mohammad Khanlu tribe, comprising 60 households, used the village as their winter quarters.  At the 2006 census, its population was 604, in 153 families. According to a more recent  statistics, by 2012, the population had increased to 1786 people in 496 families. This rate of population growth is perhaps the highest in Arasbaran region, and it is expected that the village will be designated as a city in near future.

References 

Khoda Afarin County

Populated places in East Azerbaijan Province

Populated places in Khoda Afarin County
Kurdish settlements in East Azerbaijan Province